Guyjeh-ye Soltan (also Romanized as Gūyjeh-ye Solţān, Gowyjeh Solţān, and Gowyjeh-ye Solţān; also known as Deija Sultān, Deydzha-Sul’tan, Deyjeh Solţān, and Goyjeh Soltān) is a village in Ozomdel-e Jonubi Rural District, in the Central District of Varzaqan County, East Azerbaijan Province, Iran. At the 2006 census, its population was 803, in 183 families.

References 

Towns and villages in Varzaqan County